The Creator (Tvoritelj, 2000) is a collection of poetry by the Serbian-American poet Dejan Stojanović (1959). The book, originally written in Serbian, contains 62 poems in nine sequences: "The Light-Bearer," "Forest of the Universe," "A Talk of Fire," "The Whisper of Eternity," "A Smiling Sky," "Thought and Flight," "Same and Change," "The Dream Chamber," and "Nostalgic Elements."

References

External links
Amazon
Open Library

2012 poetry books
American poetry collections